Horsfieldia decalvata is a species of plant in the family Myristicaceae. It is a tree endemic to the Maluku Islands in Indonesia.

References

decalvata
Endemic flora of the Maluku Islands
Trees of the Maluku Islands
Vulnerable plants
Taxonomy articles created by Polbot